WinLibre was a package of free and open source software for Microsoft Windows, in French and English. WinLibre is no longer maintained, as its latest version is 0.3.1 from December 18, 2004. Many of the packages are outdated by several releases.

Included programs

Office
OpenOffice.org 1.1.3
PDFCreator

Internet
Mozilla Firefox 1.0
Mozilla Thunderbird 1.0
Gaim
Nvu 0.6.0
FileZilla

Creation
The GIMP
Inkscape 0.40
Blender 2.35
Audacity 1.2.3

Multimedia
VLC media player 0.8.1
CDex
Zinf Audio Player

Tools
7-Zip
NetTime
TightVNC 1.3.5dev6
ClamWin 0.37.3
Notepad2

See also

OpenDisc
GNUWin II
Open Source Software CD
LoLiWin

References

External links
WinLibre - Free, Open Source Software for Windows

Free software distributions